Jag är konst is the seventh studio album by Markoolio, released on 3 December 2008.

Track listing
 Mvh Markoolio - 3:33
 The Markoolio Anthem - 3.21
 Är det så här det är när man är kär? - 3:05
 Vacker & rik - 3.18
 Tack - 3:14
 Gör min grej - 3:12
 Längesen - 3:34
 Första gången - 3.09
 Hoppet kvar - 3:41
 I dag - 3.14
 Sverige, det bästa på vår jord (bonus track) - 3:29

Charts

References 

2008 albums
Markoolio albums
Swedish-language albums